Moorhead is a city in Sunflower County, Mississippi, United States. As of the 2010 census, the city population was 2,405.

Geography

Moorhead is along U.S. Route 82, east of Indianola, at its intersection with Mississippi Highway 3. Moorhead is located at the intersection of the Southern and Yazoo Delta railroads. This is the origin of the legendary blues crossroads phrase "where the Southern cross the Dog".

Demographics

2020 census

As of the 2020 United States Census, there were 1,937 people, 522 households, and 313 families residing in the city.

2010 census
As of the 2010 United States Census, there were 2,405 people living in the city. The racial makeup of the city was 82.2% Black, 16.3% White, 0.3% Native American, 0.2% Asian and 0.2% from two or more races. 0.7% were Hispanic or Latino of any race.

2000 census
As of the census of 2000, there were 2,573 people, 688 households, and 520 families living in the city. The population density was 1,988.9 people per square mile (770.1/km). There were 720 housing units at an average density of 556.6 per square mile (215.5/km). The racial makeup of the city was 20.44% White, 78.97% African American, 0.19% Asian, 0.27% from other races, and 0.12% from two or more races. Hispanic or Latino of any race were 1.24% of the population.

There were 8,391 households, out of which 37.6% had children under the age of 18 living with them, 34.7% were married couples living together, 34.7% had a female householder with no husband present, and 24.3% were non-families. 20.3% of all households were made up of individuals, and 9.0% had someone living alone who was 65 years of age or older. The average household size was 3.14 and the average family size was 3.67.

In the city, the population was spread out, with 28.1% under the age of 18, 26.7% from 18 to 24, 21.3% from 25 to 44, 16.3% from 45 to 64, and 7.7% who were 65 years of age or older. The median age was 22 years. For every 100 females, there were 88.8 males. For every 100 females age 18 and over, there were 82.8 males.

The median income for a household in the city was $20,401, and the median income for a family was $23,000. Males had a median income of $26,538 versus $17,697 for females. The per capita income for the city was $8,631. About 32.4% of families and 38.0% of the population were below the poverty line, including 46.3% of those under age 18 and 33.5% of those age 65 or over.

Arts and culture

A historic plaque in Moorhead is located where the Southern Railroad once crossed the Yazoo Delta Railroad (known as the "Yellow Dog"). The Southern travelled east-west, and later became the Columbus and Greenville Railway, while the Yellow Dog travelled north-south, and later became the Yazoo and Mississippi Valley Railroad. The level junction (diamond) is still preserved as an historic site, though the north-south line has since been abandoned through Moorhead. This railroad crossing is very significant in the history of blues music. It is widely believed that W. C. Handy, after hearing an old man singing about "where the Southern cross the Yellow Dog", was moved by the sound and began what came to be known as the "blues".

Education

The City of Moorhead is served by the Sunflower County Consolidated School District (formerly Sunflower County School District). Schools serving Moorhead and in Moorhead include the K-8 school Moorhead Central School, which was formerly Moorhead Middle School until 2018. It also has James C. Rosser Early Learning Center, which was formerly James Rosser Elementary School.  it was zoned to Ruleville Central High School (now Thomas E. Edwards, Sr. High School), at the time the sole school of the district.

Moorhead is home to Mississippi Delta Community College's main campus.

The Sunflower County Library operates the Kathy June Sheriff Public Library in Moorhead.

References

External links

 
 Moorhead Middle School
 James C. Rosser Elementary School

Cities in Mississippi
Cities in Sunflower County, Mississippi